Puaa Kaa State Wayside Park is a state park on the island of Maui, Hawaii.

See also
 List of Hawaii state parks

References

Protected areas of Maui
State parks of Hawaii